Alfred Fentiman (4 October 1867 – 27 July 1943) was a British sportsman who competed in cycling as well as a range of early motorized sports. As a motorboat racer he competed in the Class A event at the 1908 Summer Olympics.

References

External links
 

1867 births
1943 deaths
British motorboat racers
Motorboat racers at the 1908 Summer Olympics
Olympic motorboat racers of Great Britain
Sportspeople from London